José Ruzzo was an Argentine stage and film actor.

Selected filmography
 By the Light of a Star (1941)
 I Want to Die with You (1941)
 Son cartas de amor (1943)
 Gold in the Hand (1943)
 Savage Pampas (1945)
 Women's Refuge (1946)
 La Secta del trébol (1948)
 Los secretos del buzón (1948)
 The Goddess of Rio Beni (1950)
 The Unwanted (1951)
 Mercado de abasto (1955)

References

Bibliography
 José Manuel Valdés Rodríguez. El cine en la Universidad de La Habana. Empresa de Publicaciones Mined, Unidad "André Voisin,", 1966.

External links

Year of birth unknown
Year of death unknown
Argentine male film actors
Argentine male stage actors